Tõnu Haljand (1 July 1945 – 28 August 1997) was an Estonian skier. He competed in the Nordic combined event at the 1968 Winter Olympics.

References

External links
 

1945 births
1997 deaths
Estonian male Nordic combined skiers
Olympic Nordic combined skiers of the Soviet Union
Nordic combined skiers at the 1968 Winter Olympics
Estonian male biathletes
Sportspeople from Tallinn